Hulda Salmi (5 April 1879 – 8 April 1949) was a Finnish schoolteacher and politician, born in Nastola. She was a Member of the Parliament of Finland from 1910 to 1918, representing the Social Democratic Party of Finland (SDP). She was imprisoned from 1918 to 1921 for having sided with the Reds during the Finnish Civil War.

References

1879 births
1949 deaths
People from Nastola
People from Häme Province (Grand Duchy of Finland)
Social Democratic Party of Finland politicians
Members of the Parliament of Finland (1910–11)
Members of the Parliament of Finland (1911–13)
Members of the Parliament of Finland (1913–16)
Members of the Parliament of Finland (1916–17)
Members of the Parliament of Finland (1917–19)
Women members of the Parliament of Finland
People of the Finnish Civil War (Red side)
Prisoners and detainees of Finland